Defending champion Ashleigh Barty successfully defended her title after Bianca Andreescu retired from the final with the scoreline at 6–3, 4–0. Barty saved a match point in the second round against Kristína Kučová en route to the title.

Barty and Naomi Osaka were in contention for the WTA No. 1 singles ranking. Barty retained the top ranking by winning the title after Osaka lost to Maria Sakkari in the quarterfinals, ending a 23-match winning streak dating to the 2020 Cincinnati Masters.

Seeds
All seeds received a bye into the second round.

Draw

Finals

Top half

Section 1

Section 2

Section 3

Section 4

Bottom half

Section 5

Section 6

Section 7

Section 8

Qualifying

Seeds

Qualifiers

Lucky loser
  Kirsten Flipkens

Qualifying draw

First qualifier

Second qualifier

Third qualifier

Fourth qualifier

Fifth qualifier

Sixth qualifier

Seventh qualifier

Eighth qualifier

Ninth qualifier

Tenth qualifier

Eleventh qualifier

Twelfth qualifier

References

External links
 Main draw
 Qualifying draw

2021 WTA Tour
Women's Singles